EROS may refer to:

Science and technology
 Center for Earth Resources Observation and Science, the US national archive of remotely sensed images of the Earth's land surface
 Encyclopedia of Reagents for Organic Synthesis, containing a description of the use of all reagents in organic chemistry
 Extremely Reliable Operating System, an operating system developed by The EROS Group, the University of Pennsylvania and Johns Hopkins University
 Earth Resources Observation Satellite, a series of Israeli commercial Earth observation satellites
 Event-related optical signal, a brain-scanning signal

Other uses
 Eelam Revolutionary Organisation of Students, a militant Tamil separatist group in Sri Lanka
 JDT 1650R EROS, a Mini-MAX aircraft

See also
 Eros (disambiguation)
 ERO (disambiguation)